Uptime is a measure of system reliability, expressed as the percentage of time a machine, typically a computer, has been working and available. Uptime is the opposite of downtime.

It is often used as a measure of computer operating system reliability or stability, in that this time represents the time a computer can be left unattended without crashing, or needing to be rebooted for administrative or maintenance purposes.
Conversely, long uptime may indicate negligence, because some critical updates can require reboots on some platforms.

Records
In 2005, Novell reported a server with a 6-year uptime. Although that might sound unusual, that is actually common when servers are maintained under an industrial context and host critical applications such as banking systems.

Netcraft maintains the uptime records for many thousands of web hosting computers.

A server running Novell NetWare has been reported to have been shut down after 16 years of uptime due to a failing hard disk.

A Cisco router has been reported to have been running continuously for 21 years.

Determining system uptime

Microsoft Windows

Windows Task Manager

Some versions of Microsoft Windows include an uptime field in Windows Task Manager, under the "Performance" tab.  The format is D:HH:MM:SS (days, hours, minutes, seconds).

systeminfo
The output of the systeminfo command includes a "System Up Time" or "System Boot Time" field.

C:\>systeminfo | findstr "Time:"
System Up Time:            0 Days, 8 Hours, 7 Minutes, 19 Seconds

The exact text and format is dependent on the language and locale.  The time given by systeminfo is not reliable.  It does not take into account time spent in sleep or hibernation.  Thus, the boot time will drift forward every time the computer sleeps or hibernates.

NET command
The NET command with its STATISTICS sub-command provides the date and time the computer started, for both the NET STATISTICS WORKSTATION and NET STATISTICS SERVER variants.  The command NET STATS SRV is shorthand for NET STATISTICS SERVER. The exact text and date format is dependent on the configured language and locale.

C:\>NET STATISTICS WORKSTATION | findstr "since"
Statistics since 8/31/2009 8:52:29 PM

Windows Management Instrumentation (WMI)
Uptime can be determined via Windows Management Instrumentation (WMI), by querying the LastBootUpTime property of the Win32_OperatingSystem class.  At the command prompt, this can be done using the wmic command:

C:\>wmic os get lastbootuptime
LastBootUpTime
20110508161751.822066+060

The timestamp uses the format yyyymmddhhmmss.nnn, so in the above example, the computer last booted up on 8 May 2011 at 16:17:51.822.  The text "LastBootUpTime" and the timestamp format do not vary with language or locale.  WMI can also be queried using a variety of application programming interfaces, including VBScript or PowerShell.

Uptime.exe
Microsoft formerly provided a downloadable utility called Uptime.exe, which reports elapsed time in days, hours, minutes, and seconds.

C:\>Uptime
SYSTEMNAME has been up for: 2 day(s), 4 hour(s), 24 minute(s), 47 second(s)

The time given by Uptime.exe is not reliable.  It does not take into account time spent in sleep or hibernation.  Thus, the boot time will drift forward every time the computer sleeps or hibernates.

FreeDOS
The uptime command is also available for FreeDOS. The version was developed by M. Aitchison.

Linux

Using uptime
Users of Linux systems can use the BSD uptime utility, which also displays the system load averages for the past 1, 5 and 15 minute intervals:

$ uptime
  18:17:07 up 68 days,  3:57,  6 users,  load average: 0.16, 0.07, 0.06

Using /proc/uptime
Shows how long the system has been on since it was last restarted:

$ cat /proc/uptime
  350735.47 234388.90

The first number is the total number of seconds the system has been up. The second number is how much of that time the machine has spent idle, in seconds. On multi core systems (and some Linux versions) the second number is the sum of the idle time accumulated by each CPU.

BSD

Using uptime
BSD-based operating systems such as FreeBSD, Mac OS X and SySVr4 have the uptime command (See ).
$ uptime
3:01AM  up 69 days,  7:53, 0 users, load averages: 0.08, 0.07, 0.05

The uptime program on BSD is a Hard link to the w program. The w program is based on the RSTS/E, TOPS-10 and TOPS-20 SYSTAT program.

Using sysctl
There is also a method of using sysctl to call the system's last boot time:

$ sysctl kern.boottime
kern.boottime: { sec = 1271934886, usec = 667779 } Thu Apr 22 12:14:46 2010

OpenVMS
On OpenVMS systems, the show system command can be used at the DCL command prompt to obtain the system uptime.  The first line of the resulting display includes the system's uptime, displayed as days followed by hours:minutes:seconds.  In the following example, the command qualifier /noprocess suppresses the display of per-process detail lines of information.

$ show system/noprocess
OpenVMS V7.3-2 on node JACK 29-JAN-2008 16:32:04.67  Uptime  894 22:28:52The command output above shows that node JACK on 29 January 2008 at 16:32:04.67 has uptime: 894 days 22 hours 28 minutes and 52 seconds.

See also

 Availability
 List of Unix commands
 Maintenance window
 System profiler
  – can allow remote estimation of uptime 
 Website monitoring
 Who (Unix) – can display the time the system was booted

References

Real-time computing
Unix user management and support-related utilities
Fault-tolerant computer systems
Windows administration